Muritaia is a genus of South Pacific tangled nest spiders first described by Raymond Robert Forster & C. L. Wilton in 1973.

Species
 it contains five species, all found in New Zealand:
Muritaia kaituna Forster & Wilton, 1973 – New Zealand
Muritaia longispinata Forster & Wilton, 1973 – New Zealand
Muritaia orientalis Forster & Wilton, 1973 – New Zealand
Muritaia parabusa Forster & Wilton, 1973 – New Zealand
Muritaia suba Forster & Wilton, 1973 – New Zealand

References

Amaurobiidae
Araneomorphae genera
Spiders of New Zealand
Taxa named by Raymond Robert Forster